Nallur Kandaswamy Kovil  is a significant Hindu temple, located in Nallur, Northern Province, Sri Lanka. The presiding deity is Lord Murugan  in the form of the holy 'Vel' in the Sanctum, the primary shrine, and in other forms, namely, Shanmugar, Muthukumaraswami, Valli Kaanthar with consorts Valli and Deivayanai, and Thandayuthapani, sans consorts in secondary shrines in the temple.

Origins – The earlier shrines of Kandaswamy in Nallur 
The original, Kandaswamy Temple was founded in 948 ad. According to the Yalpana Vaipava Malai, the temple was developed at the site in the 15th century by Parakramabahu VI King of Kotte. Sapumal Kumaraya (also known as Chempaha Perumal in Tamil), who ruled the Jaffna kingdom on behalf of the Kotte kingdom is credited with building the third Nallur Kandaswamy temple. Nallur served as the capital of the Jaffna kings, with the royal palace situated very close to the temple. Nallur was built with four entrances with gates. There were two main roadways and four temples at the four gateways.

The present rebuilt temple that exists now does not match their original locations which instead are occupied by churches erected by the Portuguese. The center of the city was Muthirai Santhai (market place) and was surrounded by a square fortification around it. There were courtly buildings for the kings, Brahmin priests, soldiers, and other service providers. The old Kandaswamy temple functioned as a defensive fort with high walls. In general, the city was laid out like the traditional temple town according to Hindu traditions. Cankilian Thoppu, the facade of the palace of King Cankili II, can still be found in Nallur. The third temple was destroyed by the Portuguese Catholic colonial Filipe de Oliveira in 1624 AD. The original kovil was located where St. James' Church, Nallur is located today. Part of the original Shivalingam of the Nallur Kandaswamy Temple was located in the Vicarage till 1995 when it was destroyed during the recapture of Jaffna by Sri Lanka armed forces and the platform where the shiva lingam was mounted on can still be seen in the hallway of the vicarage.

Present Temple 
The fourth and the present temple was constructed in 1734 A.D. during  Dutch colonial era by  'Don Juan' Ragunatha Maapaana Mudaliyar, who served as a Shroff in the Dutch Katchery,  in a place identified then as the 'Kurukkal Valavu. Krishnaiyar a Brahmin, served as the first priest of the temple.

Initially, the temple was built using bricks and stones and had a cadjan roof, enshrining a 'Vel' in the middle. The original shrine had only two small halls.

Ragunatha Maapaana Mudaliyar's descendants continued to administer the temple as Custodians of the temple over the past centuries and to date many additions have been made to bring the temple to its present Glory.

The start of the  'Golden Period' in the history of Nallur Temple is recorded as post-1890, soon after the taking over the temple administration by Arumuga Maapaana Mudaliyar, the 7th Custodian. The first Bell tower was erected by him in 1899 and he made many improvements to the temple including the main Sanctum, renovating it using granite to pave the floor of the Sanctum in 1902. The first enclosing wall was erected in 1909 by him. Likewise, the temple has been gradually renovated from time to time by its successors to date. After the year 1964, the year the present and the 10th Custodian, Kumaradas Maapaana Mudaliyar took over office, extensive improvements have been made to-date, virtually rebuilding the entire complex and making it physically the largest Hindu Temple Complex in the country. The custom of the annual 'Thiruppani', introduced by him, has seen the temple growing into its present splendor. Today the temple has four Gopurams and six Bell Towers, along with its fortified walls, giving it an appearance of a citadel in Nallur.

The temple has the main entrance facing the east. It has an ornately carved five-story tower or gopuram in the Dravidian architecture style at the main entrance.

In the surrounding inner very or circumambulatory path,  it has shrines for Lords Ganesh, Palliyarai, Sandana Gopalar, Goddess Gajavalli Mahavalli, Vairavar and Sooriyan with Consorts, and Vairavar.

In the southern part of this temple, the holy pond and Thandayudhapaani shrine can be seen. On the northern side, one finds the 'Poonthottam' the holy garden.

Social significance 
The temple is a socially important institution for the Sri Lankan Tamils Hindu identity of the north Sri Lanka. In the Sri Lankan Tamil diaspora, many temples have been built in Europe and North America using the same name as cultural memory. Thanks to its Administration and strict discipline admired and revered by the devotees, Nallur Kovil is the epitome of punctuality, order, and neatness, and provides a model for all Saiva temples. Above all, it is the manner in which religious ceremonies are conducted with such impeccable timing and strict discipline that makes it a favorite amongst devotees.

New Raja Gopuram Additions 

On 21 August 2011, the temple unveiled its new Nine-storey Raja Gopuram, Named 'Shanmuha Raja Gopuram' with an entrance called ' Swarna Vaasal' ( The Golden Entrance ) at 7:00 am local time.

Another New Raja Gopuram was unveiled on 4 September 2015 at 07 a.m. local time, creating a new Northern entrance to the temple complex.
It is known as 'Gubera Raja Gopuram', and the entrance is named 'Kubera Vaasal'. This tower slightly overpowers the Southern tower and to date recorded as the biggest Gopuram on the Island.  'Guberan' is the deity for wealth and he protects the Northern direction. It is believed by the local people that this Gopuram will attract more wealth to the people of the Jaffna peninsula.

Festivals 

The temple hosts the annual festival which begins with the hoisting of the Holy flag – the Kodiyetram. The cloth for hoisting is ceremonially brought to the temple in a small chariot from a family belonging to the Sengunthar Kaikola Mudaliyar dynasty, for centuries.

The festival is spread over a period of twenty-five days during which various Yāgams Abishekams and special poojas are conducted.
The major religious festivals people flock to witness are the Manjam, Thirukkarthikai, Kailasavahanam, Velvimanam, Thandayuthepani it's a being, Sapparam, Ther festival procession, Theertham – the water cutting festival, and Thirukalyanam – The holy wedding. The Ther Thiruvila (chariot festival) is the most popular of all events is very colorful and commences at 6.15 am. The glamorously dressed Lord Shanmuhar and his consorts are carried out on a Silver Throne called 'Simmasanam', an intricately carved masterpiece created by the 7th Custodian, Arumuga Maapaana Mudaliyar in the year 1900.  Hundreds of devotees carrying it on their shoulders, and the Simmasanam which floats on the heads of thousands of devotees shouting 'Aro haraam' is a sight not to be missed.

The huge and heavy chariot carrying the statue of God Shanmuhar and consorts is paraded along the streets of the Temple. The chariot pulled by a rope of thousands of devotees, rich and poor, old and young stands shoulder to shoulder in pulling it giving God Murugan the opportunity to witness the sincerity and purity of the devotees.

See also 
Northern Province, Sri Lanka
Hinduism in Sri Lanka
Arumuka Navalar

References

Nallur Festival  

nallurkanthan.com
Nallur Murukan Temple's web
Nalluran.Com
Site about Nallur as the capital city of Jaffna Kingdom
Nallur Chariot Festival
Nallur Kandaswamy Kovil in 3D view requires silverlight

10th-century establishments in Sri Lanka
1624 disestablishments in Asia
17th-century disestablishments in Sri Lanka
1749 establishments in Asia
18th-century establishments in Sri Lanka
Buildings and structures completed in the 10th century
Buildings and structures demolished in the 17th century
Buildings and structures completed in 1749
Hindu temples in Jaffna District
Religious buildings and structures in Jaffna
Murugan temples in Sri Lanka
Religious buildings and structures completed in the 940s
10th-century Hindu temples
Nallur DS Division